Alişan Şeker (born 4 July 1986) is a Turkish professional footballer who plays as a goalkeeper for Iğdır FK. He has also been capped at the U-20 level for Turkey.

Club career
Şeker began his career with Kemerspor in 1999. He was transferred to Türk Telekom Gençlik Spor Kulübü in 2003. Sivasspor transferred him at the beginning of the 2009–10 season.

References

External links
Alişan Şeker at Soccerway

1986 births
Living people
Turkish footballers
Türk Telekom G.S.K. footballers
Sivasspor footballers
Orduspor footballers
Alanyaspor footballers
Süper Lig players
Turkey youth international footballers
TFF First League players
Association football goalkeepers